This is a listing of the horses that finished in either first, second, or third place and the number of starters in the Maryland Million Turf, an American State-bred stakes race for horses three years-old and up at 1-1/8 miles on the turf held at Laurel Park Racecourse in Laurel, Maryland.  (List 1986-present)

See also

 Maryland Million Turf
 Maryland Million Day
 Laurel Park Racecourse

References

 Maryland Thoroughbred official website

Horse races in Maryland
Recurring events established in 1986
Laurel Park Racecourse
Recurring sporting events established in 1986
1986 establishments in Maryland